The following is a list of mayors of the city of Luhansk, Ukraine. It includes positions equivalent to mayor, such as chairperson of the city council executive committee.

Mayors 

 , 1883-1891
 Verbovsky Vladimir Ivanovich, 1891-1902
 Lutovinov Stefan Klimentiyovych, 1902-1908
 Gryazev Mykola Oleksandrovych, 1908-1909
 Nikolaev Ivan Ivanovich, 1909-1912
 Sidorov Feodul Petrovich, 1912
 Lutovinov Stefan Klimentiyovych, 1912-1914
 Kholodilin Ivan Ivanovich, 1914-1915
 Vasnev Mykola Serhiiovych, 1915-1917
 , 1917	
 Lyubomudrov Fedor Vasilyevich, 1919	
 Danilovsky, 1919
 Rimsky-Korsakov (Larin) Grigory Mikhailovich, 1917
 Weil Mikhail Abramovich, 1917
 , 1917
 , 1917
 Makarov Alexander Vasilyevich, 1917
 Kliment Voroshilov, 1917
 , 1917-1918
 , 1918-1920
 Popov Semyon Pavlovich, 1918-1919
 , 1919-1924
 , 1919 
 , 1920, 1923-1925
 Kudrich Vladimir Yudovich, 1920 
 Kutuzov, 1920-1921
 Zhukov Ivan Stepanovich, 1921
 Rudenko, 1925
 , 1925-1926
 , 1926-1927
 Polukhov Mikhail Martinovich, 1927
 Golyapin Ivan Semenovich, 1927-1929
 , 1930-1931
 Karpenko Petro Yukhimovich, 1931-1932
 Mykola Fedorovych Polyansky, 1932-1933
 Lewandowski Stanislav Martynovych, 1933
 Volevach Konstantin Omelyanovich, 1933-1934
 Gudkov Prokop Andreevich, 1934-1937
 Puzanov Pavel Ilyich, 1937
 , 1937-1938
 , 1938
 Simankov Kirill Nikolaevich, 1938-1939
 Zverev Petro Yakovlevich, 1939-1944
 Mushroom Alexander Andreevich, 1944-1946
 Zheltetsky V., 1946
 , 1946-1947
 Yenenko Fedor Vladimirovich, 1947
 Khachko Philip Sergeevich, 1948-1950
 Strepetov Konstantin Ivanovich, 1950-1960
 Lekhtsiev Ilya Georgievich, 1960-1965
 Petrov Georgy Semenovich, 1965-1985
 , 1985-1987
 Pantyukhin Vladimir Alexandrovich, 1987-1994	
 Oleksiy Danilov, 1994-1997	
 Parapanov Anatoly Ivanovich, 1997-1998
 , 1998-2001	
 , 2001-2002
 , 2002-2006	
 , 2006-2014	
 Pilavov Manolis Vasyliovych, 2014-

See also
 Luhansk history
 Timeline of Luhansk (in Ukrainian)

References

This article incorporates information from the Russian Wikipedia and Ukrainian Wikipedia.

History of Luhansk Oblast
Luhansk